Radio România Actualităţi is the first radio channel in Romania, both in coverage, number of listeners, and timeline (it is the first radio to broadcast). It is owned by the Romanian Radio Broadcasting Company.

See also
Eastern Bloc information dissemination

External links
 Mother-company official site
 Official site

Radio stations in Romania
Romanian-language radio stations
Eastern Bloc mass media
Radio stations established in 1928
Actualități